The Town of Newport is located in Columbia County, Wisconsin, United States. The population was 681 at the 2000 census. The ghost town of Moe Settlement was located in the town.

Geography
According to the United States Census Bureau, the town has a total area of 22.1 square miles (57.2 km2), of which, 21.5 square miles (55.6 km2) of it is land and 0.6 square miles (1.5 km2) of it (2.67%) is water.

Demographics
As of the census of 2000, there were 681 people, 278 households, and 192 families residing in the town. The population density was 31.7 people per square mile (12.2/km2).  There were 334 housing units at an average density of 15.6 per square mile (6.0/km2). The racial makeup of the town was 97.94% White, 0.59% African American, 1.03% Native American and 0.44% Asian. Hispanic or Latino of any race were 0.59% of the population.

There were 278 households, out of which 29.5% had children under the age of 18 living with them, 59.4% were married couples living together, 7.2% had a female householder with no husband present, and 30.6% were non-families. 25.5% of all households were made up of individuals, and 7.2% had someone living alone who was 65 years of age or older. The average household size was 2.45 and the average family size was 2.95.

In the town, the population was spread out, with 24.7% under the age of 18, 4.8% from 18 to 24, 28.5% from 25 to 44, 24.8% from 45 to 64, and 17.2% who were 65 years of age or older. The median age was 40 years. For every 100 females, there were 94.0 males. For every 100 females age 18 and over, there were 90.0 males.

The median income for a household in the town was $45,833, and the median income for a family was $52,000. Males had a median income of $35,781 versus $20,156 for females. The per capita income for the town was $19,390. About 4.5% of families and 5.7% of the population were below the poverty line, including 5.0% of those under age 18 and 6.7% of those age 65 or over.

Education
It is in the service area of the School District of Wisconsin Dells, which operates Spring Hill Middle School and Wisconsin Dells High School.

Notable people
Charles A. Cady, member of the Wisconsin State Assembly
Frank A. Cady, lawyer, member of the Wisconsin State Assembly

References

Further reading 
 

Towns in Columbia County, Wisconsin
Madison, Wisconsin, metropolitan statistical area
Towns in Wisconsin